Poonam Joshi is an Indian television soap opera actress. She has performed in TV shows such as Bhabhi, Kahaani Ghar Ghar Kii, Kahiin To Hoga, Saat Phere: Saloni Ka Safar. She is a follower of Buddhism.

Filmography

Television

References

External links

Living people
Year of birth missing (living people)
Indian soap opera actresses
Indian television actresses
Indian Buddhists
Actors from Mumbai